The 1912 Copa del Rey Final was the 11th final of the Spanish cup competition, the Copa del Rey. The final was played at Camp de la Indústria in Barcelona on 7 April 1912. The match was won by FC Barcelona, who beat Real Sociedad Gimnástica Española from Madrid 2–0, with goals from Alfredo Massana and Pepe Rodríguez.

Out of the 11 players that lined-up for Barcelona in the final, 7 were on the line-up of Catalonia's first official international match on 20 February 1912 against France (Berdié, Massana, Estévez and Pakán being the outsiders).

Match details 

|}

References

1912
1911–12 in Spanish football
FC Barcelona matches
Sociedad Gimnástica matches